Lophopus is a genus of bryozoans from the family Lophopodidae.

Species
 Lophopus brisbanensis Colledge, 1917
 Lophopus crystallinus (Pallas, 1768)
 Lophopus jheringi Meissner, 1893

References

Bryozoan genera
Phylactolaemata